St. Giles' Church, West Bridgford is an Anglican parish church in West Bridgford, Nottinghamshire.

The church is Grade II listed by the Department for Digital, Culture, Media and Sport as it is a building of special architectural or historic interest.

History

St. Giles is a medieval church but little remains. It was restored by Thomas Chambers Hine in 1872 and again by Naylor and Sale between 1896 and 1911. The foundation stone for the restoration in 1896 was laid on 18 October 1896 by Lady Byron of Thrumpton Hall. This restoration involved a new nave and chancel at a cost of £5,500.

Features
It retains a medieval screen from the late fourteenth century. There is some stained glass by James Powell and Sons.

Organ
A small organ dating from 1840 was bought in 1871 from St. Stephen's Church, Sneinton. It was sold to Lady Bay Church in 1898 when the next pipe organ by Charles Lloyd and Co built at a cost of £500 was opened on 22 November 1899 Although provision was made for 3 manuals, only 2 were initially fitted with pipes as an additional £300 was required to complete the work.

It was enlarged in 1919 when it was moved to the newly constructed King George Aisle. In 1951 it was rebuilt by Henry Willis & Sons and again in 1971. It was replaced by an electronic organ in 1993. The organ console was used in the rebuilding of an organ in Trinity United Reformed Church, Wimbledon, London.

Organists
George Gunn 1871 - 1875
William Stevenson 1884 - 1892
Miss Pemberton ca. 1895 - 1898
James Buckland Lyddon 1898 - 1904
Vernon Sydney Read 1904 - 1905
James Buckland Lyddon 1905 - 1907
William Ryde 1908 - ca 1912
Mrs Hector Tomkins ca. 1912 - 1920
Charles Bissill Morris 1920 - 1924 (afterwards organist of Castle Gate Congregational Centre)
Dudley Newball 1924 - 1941
John Gordon Wood 1941 - 1957
Malcolm Boyle 1957 - 1961
Harold Bebbington 1961 - 1965
Walter L Rogers 1965 - 1970
A Walter Esswood 1970 - 1984
Fred G Munday 1985 - 1995
Alan J Hindle 1995 - 2002
Andrew John Rootham 2002 - 2015
Dr Paul Bracken 2015 -

Sources

West Bridgford
West Bridgford
West Bridgford